is a Japanese diplomat and academic who currently serves as the National Security Advisor to the Prime Minister of Japan. He is the first head of the National Security Council founded in December 2013.

History
Yachi was born in Kanazawa City and was raised in Toyama.

Yachi received his master's degree at the University of Tokyo Graduate School for Law and Politics in 1969. He entered the Ministry of Foreign Affairs at that time, retiring in 2008. His service in the Foreign Ministry included work in the Asian Affairs Bureau, the Treaties Bureau, the North American Affairs Bureau, and the Japanese delegations to the Philippines, the European Community, and the United States. He served as Vice-Minister for Foreign Affairs from 2005 to 2008.

Yachi was a foreign policy advisor to Shinzo Abe in Abe's 2006–2007 stint as Prime Minister. When Abe became Prime Minister again in late 2012, he selected Yachi to be a special advisor to his cabinet. He was appointed the first head of the NSC upon its creation in December 2013.

Career
Yachi was a self-described outlier in the risk-averse Ministry of Foreign Affairs. He was influenced by Wakaizumi Kei, an international politics thinker who acted as Prime Minister Eisaku Sato's emissary for the negotiation of secret protocols allowing the US to introduce or station nuclear weapons in Japanese territory. According to an author, Yachi has engaged extensively in secret diplomacy under Abe.

Yachi has taught at Waseda University, Sophia University, Seinan Gakuin University, Keio University, and Chuo University. From June 2012 to December 2013, he was a director for the Fujitsu corporation.

One of Yachi's first tasks as National Security Advisor was to strengthen the new NSC's relations with the American government. He met with his American counterpart, Susan Rice, as well as cabinet secretaries Chuck Hagel and John Kerry.

References

Living people
1944 births
People from Kanazawa, Ishikawa
University of Tokyo alumni
Japanese diplomats
Academic staff of Seinan Gakuin University
Consuls General of Japan in Los Angeles